Bob Moha (1890–1959) (birth name Robert Mucha) was a Milwaukee-based middleweight boxer, nicknamed the "Milwaukee Caveman".

Career
His decisive defeat of Billy Papke (then considered the lead contender for the middleweight title vacant in the wake of Stanley Ketchel's murder) at a bout in Boston on October 31, 1910, caused Papke to retire briefly from the ring.

On December 4, 1914, in a fight against Mike Gibbons of St. Paul, Minnesota held in Hudson, Wisconsin, Moha was disqualified in the second round for a blow below the belt. The sponsoring club denied him a share of the purse, since the fight did not go to a decision, and Moha sued them. The case eventually went to the Wisconsin Supreme Court, which, in a 1916 ruling, agreed with the original jury that he had failed to fulfill his contractual obligation. Moha was not permitted to introduce testimony that it was customary in such cases for the fouling fighter to receive his contractual share.

Professional boxing record
All information in this section is derived from BoxRec, unless otherwise stated.

Official Record

All newspaper decisions are officially regarded as “no decision” bouts and are not counted in the win/loss/draw column.

Unofficial record

Record with the inclusion of newspaper decisions in the win/loss/draw column.

References

External links
Bob Moha at Cyberboxingzone
Bob Moha article Ring Magazine, January 2002
Bob Moha's career record Boxrec.com

1890 births
1959 deaths
Sportspeople from Milwaukee
Boxers from Wisconsin
American male boxers
Middleweight boxers